Free Your Mind... and Your Ass Will Follow is the second studio album by American funk rock band Funkadelic, released in July 1970 by Westbound Records.

Background 
The album was recorded at United Sound Studios, Audio Graphic Services, and G-M Recording Studios in Detroit. The inspiration for this album was, according to George Clinton, an attempt to "see if we can cut a whole album while we're all tripping on acid."

The album's gatefold cover forms something of a visual pun, echoing the sentiments of the album title. The woman holding her arms towards heaven in an ecstatic pose is found to be nude upon opening the sleeve.

The original 1970 issue's artwork featured the woman facing downward, and the "Free Your Mind..." title in brown. Reissues beginning in 1990 reversed the woman's direction (substituting an alternate photograph where her head is more inclined and her fingers are more widely fanned), and have varied the placement and color of text elements.

Music and lyrics 
The album and its title track, a feedback-drenched number taking a third of the album's length, introduces the subversion of Christian themes explored on later songs, describing a mystical approach to salvation in which "the Kingdom of Heaven is within" and achievable through freeing one's mind, after which one's "ass" will follow. Many of the songs (such as the title track and "Eulogy and Light") subvert Christian themes, including the Lord's Prayer and the 23rd Psalm.

Reception

On the Billboard charts (North America), Free Your Mind... and Your Ass Will Follow peaked at #11 on the Black Albums Chart and #92 on the Pop Albums chart. The album and eponymous song influenced the band En Vogue, leading to the title of their hit song "Free Your Mind".

In Christgau's Record Guide: Rock Albums of the Seventies (1981), Robert Christgau said this promising but ultimately confusing album has contradictory messages that might either promote "escapist idealism or psychic liberation", and a disorienting aesthetic that is most successful on "Funky Dollar Bill". He later wrote that it is not surprising that the album became "a cult fave in slackerland. Not only is the shit weird, the weirdness signifies." In a retrospective review for Blender, Christgau opined that the album did not live up to the title credo.

In a positive review, AllMusic's Ned Raggett felt that both the album and title track are worthy of the credo and that the other songs range from "the good to astoundingly great." Record Collector magazine's Paul Rigby observed clearly written lyrics and interesting space rock-like funk on what he called a "superb" album.

Track listing

Notes
Track 9 is a mono recording.

Personnel
Credits are adapted from Muze.

Funkadelic
 George Clinton – lead vocals (tracks 1, 5, 6)
 Ray Davis – vocals
 Fuzzy Haskins – vocals, lead vocals (track 7)
 Calvin Simon – vocals
 Grady Thomas – vocals
 Eddie Hazel – guitar, lead vocals (tracks 2, 4, 5, 7), backward vocal (track 6)
 Tawl Ross – guitar, lead vocals (tracks 3)
 Bernie Worrell – Hammond organ, Vox organ, piano
 Billy Nelson – bass guitar, lead vocals (tracks 2, 4)
 Tiki Fulwood – drums

Martha Reeves appeared on this project but wasn't credited.
Telma Hopkins and Joyce Vincent, the singers to be known as Dawn, appear on "Friday Night, August 14th."

Production
Produced by George Clinton
Engineering by Ed Wolfrum, Milan Bogdan
Art direction by David Krieger
Photography by Joel Brodsky
Album design – The Graffiteria, Stanley Hochstadt
Album co-ordination – Dorothy Schwartz
Production supervision – Bob Scerbo
Executive producer – Armen Boladian
Orga Dorga Services – Bernie Mendelson

References

External links
 

Funkadelic albums
1970 albums
Westbound Records albums
Albums produced by George Clinton (funk musician)
Albums with cover art by Joel Brodsky